Yuri Aramaisovich Yerznkyan (26 January 1922 – 19 December 1996) was a Soviet Armenian film director and actor.

Yerznkyan was born in Georgia, and in 1940–41 studied at the Vakhtangov Theatre in Moscow. In 1943, he moved to Yerevan in Armenia, where he worked at Hayfilm, first as actor and then as film director. In 1946, he returned to Moscow and by 1949 completed directing courses of the Moscow Film Institute. He started his own directorial work in 1953, in Yerevan, and in 1982 was appointed as the head of directing faculty of the Armenian State Pedagogical University. Earlier in 1975 Yerznkyan was awarded the title of People's Artist of the Armenian SSR. He died in Moscow, and was buried in Yerevan.

Yerznkyan had a daughter, Anna, and a son, Ruben; both children headed cinematography-related departments at the Armenian State Pedagogical University.

Filmography
 1955: Looking for the Addressee
 1956: Captives of Hovazadzor
 1958: The Song of First Love
 1958: About My Friend
 1964: Difficult Passage
 1969: Bridges Over Oblivion
 1971: Khatabala

References

External links

1922 births
1996 deaths
Armenian film directors
Soviet Armenians
Soviet film directors
People's Artists of Armenia
Armenian male film actors
20th-century Armenian male actors